This is a listing of the horses that finished in either first, second, or third place and the number of starters in the Pimlico Special Handicap, one of America's grade one handicap races run over dirt at 1-1/16 miles at Pimlico Race Course  in Baltimore, Maryland.

See also 
 List of graded stakes at Pimlico Race Course

References 

Pimlico Race Course